is a Japanese television series that premiered on Fuji TV on New Year's Day, 1963 (a Tuesday), and is the first popular animated Japanese television series that embodied the aesthetic that later became familiar worldwide as anime. It originated as a manga of the same name in 1952 by Osamu Tezuka, revered in Japan as the "God of Manga".  It lasted for four seasons, with a total of 193 episodes, the final episode presented on a Saturday, New Year's Eve 1966.

At its height it was watched by 40% of the Japanese population who had access to a TV. In 1964, there was a feature-length animated movie called  released in Japan. It was compiled from three selected episodes from the series—episodes 46 ("The Robot Spaceship"), 56 ("Earth Defense Army") and 71 ("The Last Day of Earth"), respectively; the latter two were filmed and produced in color.

Between 1963 and 1965, 104 episodes were aired in the United States, adapted to the English language. After enjoying success both in Japan and abroad as the first anime to be broadcast overseas, Astro Boy was remade in the 1980s under the name New Mighty Atom and again in 2003 as Astro Boy: Mighty Atom.

Plot 
The first Astro Boy anime is set in the year 2013, rather than 2003 of the original manga. Dr. Tenma, a scientist working in the Ministry of Science's Department of Precision Machinery, loses his only son, Tobio, in a car-crash. Out of grief, he orders the production of a "super-robotic" in Tobio's likeness. Though the robotic is the most advanced anyone has ever seen, he is not pleased with it because it does not grow, and in a fit of rage he sells it to the circus. After this, he loses his job at the Ministry of Science and rarely appears again. He harnesses a complicated relationship towards robotics, mainly believing that they should not be treated as humans but as slaves.

In the circus, where robotics exist but are a lot more primitively made than Tobio (now named Atom), they are forced to participate in fighting tournaments similar to gladiator battles. However, Atom wishes to be peaceful. Eventually, he runs into Professor Ochanomizu, the man who succeeded Dr. Tenma at the head of the Ministry of Science; Ochanomizu is treated much differently than Tenma, being regarded as a savior figure by the robots for his affection and kindness towards them that Tenma did not possess. After realising how advanced Atom is compared to the rest of the other robotics, he sets him free from the circus, becoming a surrogate father figure to him.

Characters
Atom / Astro Boy, A robotic created and modeled upon Dr. Boynton's late son, Astor Boynton. At first, Dr. Boynton enjoyed his company and having his son back, however he rejected the robotic after realizing he could not grow up physically like a real human child. With this, the robotic Astor was sold to the cruel circus owner, The Great Cacciatore, in order to perform in a circus and renamed as Astro. After a fire broke out during a circus show, Astro saved Cacciatore and was granted his freedom, due in part by intervention from Dr. Elefun and following the Law of Robotic Rights being passed to grant robots the ability to lead the same lives as humans. Astro has several special powers, such as flying with rockets, super hearing, 100,000 horsepower, superhuman endurance and a machine gun which lies in his backside. In the final episode, which aired only in Japan, Astro sacrifices himself to save the Earth while carrying a shutter which would normalize the sun, which was threatening all life on the planet.  Astro is voiced by Mari Shimizu with the exception of episodes 97-106 where he is voiced by Kazue Tagami.
Professor Ochanomizu / Dr. Packidermus J. Elefun, head of the Ministry of Science after Dr. Boynton resigned. He is Astro's father figure and mentor, and is very supportive of him. He also created a robot family for Astro, including a mother, father, and a robot sister named Uran. Afterward, he reactivated the prototype of Astro, Cobalt, as his brother. Dr. Elefun always stands for robot's rights and does not want Astro to take part in unnecessary battles.  Ochanomizu is voiced by Hisashi Katsuta.
Doctor Umataro Tenma / Dr. Astor Boynton II, former head of the Ministry of Science. He lost his only son, Astor Boynton III, to a deadly traffic accident. Overcome with grief, he vowed to recreate Astor as a great and powerful robot, and used every available resource of the Ministry to create his greatest creation: Astro Boy. Once he activated Astro, he was seemingly mentally better, but grew frustrated with the fact that, as a robot, Astro did not grow physically like a human child. He sold Astro off to a circus owner, the Great Cacciatore, and resigned from the Ministry and was said to have disappeared. However, he has come out of hiding on occasion to assist Astro; one such occasion was to upgrade Astro's systems to allow him to output 1,000,000 horsepower.  Tenma is voiced by Hisashi Yokomori.
Astro Boy's parents, created by Dr. Elefun in order to make Astro feel more human-like. His mother and father are kind and doting to Astro. They were not part of the cast in the 2003 series.
Uran / Astro Girl, Astro's younger sister and his most recurring sibling. Uran was given to him as a gift on Astro's birthday. She is often tomboyish and usually gets herself in trouble, like allowing a scientist to give her the ability of splitting in two in order to both live a normal life with one body and fight in a robot battle arena with another. However, her strength was halved and her other half was destroyed. She is repaired, but no longer had the ability of splitting in two after Dr. Elefun repaired her.  Uran is voiced first by Yoko Mizugaki, secondly Reiko Mutō, and thirdly Kazuko Yoshikawa.
Cobalt / Jetto, Astro's older prototype brother. He was thrown away by Dr. Boynton as scrap for being a failed prototype and reactivated by Dr. Elefun when Astro went missing during a search for a deadly H-bomb. The two found each other deep in the ocean due to transmitting on a common frequency, and Cobalt managed to save his brother from certain destruction.  Cobalt is voiced by Kiyoshi Komiyama
Chiitan, Astro's baby brother (not shown in the English dubbed version). Dr. Elefun had made him alongside other robot babies, but Uran took him as the family's new baby brother.
Shunsaku "Higeoyaji" Ban / Victor Percival Pompous, Astro's schoolteacher and/or neighbor in the original manga; a private detective and surrogate uncle for Astro in the 1960s TV series. He is voiced first by Masaaki Yajima and secondly by Ayao Wada.
Shibugaki and Tamao / Dinny and Specs, two of Astro's friends. Tamao is a very good friend for Astro, while Shibugaki is rather a bully who learns of Astro's moral values after some adventures.
Chief Nakamura / Chief McLaw, Inspector Tawashi's partner who is made for comical relief, he acknowledges Astro's bravery and often tries to defend him from his partner Tawashi, specially when Astro is accused of a crime he did not commit.  Nakamura is voiced by Shinpei Sakamoto
Inspector Tawashi / Inspector Gumshoe, A police inspector who has a huge distaste for robots and doesn't have much faith in Astro until he manages to prove his worth.  Tawashi is voiced first by Shingo Kanemoto and secondly by Koichi Chiba
Astor Boynton III / Tobio Tenma, the little boy Astro was modeled after, who dies in the first episode.

Production 

According to Osamu Tezuka, the main themes of much of the manga he had created, specifically Astro Boy, were that of anti-war, the preservation of nature, and discrimination, which had emanated from his childhood experiencing the devastation of World War II.

Since Mighty Atom ended up being re-written more than ten times, either due to limits on size or duration in the magazines Astro Boy was published in, instead of just simply cutting or scaling down certain parts of the manga, Tezuka would completely redraw certain panels and sections of the manga to fit and flow better with the rest of the story. This means that it is hard to define what the most original, authentic version of the story is. Also, when the manga was to be made into the anime, further revisions had to be made, including a simplifying of the story to suit the less sophisticated, wider target audience the show was aiming to appeal to.

After a while, since the television company that made the series needed an output of fifty-two episodes a year, the anime quickly outpaced the manga, meaning Tezuka also had to create many original stories for the anime series that would not appear in the manga, for the purpose of filling in the gaps.

English-language version
For the English version, the producers, NBC Enterprises settled on "Astro Boy" after discussions between producer Fred Ladd and representatives from NBC. NBC Enterprises announced that it would begin syndicating 52 episodes on March 12, 1963, and the first episode premiered on Sept. 7, 1963 in the U.S. Following the series' success, NBC Enterprises announced it would syndicate an additional 52 episodes on September 16, 1964. The last of these episodes first aired on June 4, 1965, and repeats of the series continued until it was withdrawn by NBC in the early 1970s. A total of 104 episodes were adapted from the first 124 Japanese episodes and changed from their original order. In addition to this, characters' names were adjusted for American audiences. Frederik L. Schodt, who created the English version of the original comic, said that the names were "cleverly" changed for American tastes.

In one Astro Boy manga story Tezuka expressed frustration towards the restrictions passed by American television networks on the adaptation of the newly titled Astro Boy television series. The U.S. version did not air an episode showing a dog being operated on, as the producers believed it was too cruel and grotesque to show. Tezuka criticized this as hypocrisy, as non-Japanese eat and kill animals in manners he described as "grotesque". Tezuka added that many white people in Africa shot animals for sport, yet people in England spread false rumors about Japanese people eating dogs.

In 2007, 2008, and 2009, Cartoon Network broadcast and webcast NBC's syndicated edition of the original 1960s episodes as a part of its late night Adult Swim line-up. Only the first 52 episodes were aired.

The Right Stuf International and Madman Entertainment have recently released the entire dubbed series on DVD in two box sets. The Right Stuf sets also include episodes 1, 20, 34, 56, and 193 in Japanese with English subtitles, a behind-the-scenes film, and an interview with Fred Ladd.

For Right Stuf Inc. Home Entertainment's region 1 Ultra Collector's Edition DVD releases of dubbed episodes of the original 1963 series, the original English masters were destroyed in 1975, due to Tezuka's Mushi Productions filing for bankruptcy. Fortunately, Right Stuf found the best surviving voice track elements and combining them with picture quality from the original Japanese negatives.

Reception
Astro Boy was initially very popular, being the first Japanese animated television series to make it to U.S. televisions, with the highest ratings of any show at the time. However, its popularity eventually declined to the point where only 104 of the 193 original episodes were released in the U.S., the reasons being mainly that it was still in black and white when most television sets were switching to color and many of the storylines were considered too violent and depressing for the mainstream audience.

It was named the 86th best animated series by IGN, calling it the first popular anime television series. In February 2004, Cinefantastique listed the anime as one of the "10 Essential Animations", citing the show's "dark themes and Tezuka's use of sci-fi as a conduit to address such issues as war and intolerance."

References
Notes

External links 

Astro Boy
1963 Japanese television series debuts
1963 American television series debuts
1966 Japanese television series endings
1976 American television series endings
Japanese children's animated action television series
Japanese children's animated adventure television series
Japanese children's animated science fantasy television series
Japanese children's animated superhero television series
Fuji TV original programming
Animated television series about children
Animated television series about robots
First-run syndicated television programs in the United States
Television series set in the future
Mushi Production
Osamu Tezuka anime
Androids in television
Television series set in 2013